Sir Roger Martin, 2nd Baronet (c. 1667 – 3 March 1742) was son of Sir Roger Martin, 1st Baronet and Tamworth, daughter of Edward Horner of Mells, Somerset. He inherited his baronetcy from his father, who was the first Martin Baronet of Long Melford created on 28 March 1667, upon his death in 1712.

Personal life
Some time before 1689 Sir Roger married Anna-Marie Harvey (d. 15 May 1739) and by her had 2 sons:
 Sir Roger Martin, 3rd Baronet (1682 - 12 June 1762), who married Sophia Mordaunt, daughter of the honourable Brigadier General Lewis Mordaunt of Massingham in Norfolk.
 Richard Martin (1691 - After 1710)
The heraldic visitation of Suffolk in 1561 shows a third child:
Elizabeth Martin, who married a gentleman called "Rookwood", who may have been a relation through her aunt Tamworth Martin who married Thomas Rookwood of Coldham Hall in Suffolk.

Sir Roger died on 3 March 1742, when his title passed to his eldest son.

References

1667 births
1742 deaths
People from Long Melford
Baronets in the Baronetage of England